Nick Nelson may refer to:

 Nick Nelson (American football) (born 1996), American football cornerback
 Nick Nelson (baseball) (born 1995), American baseball pitcher
 Nick Nelson, a character from the graphic novel Heartstopper